The Servile State is a 1912 book by Hilaire Belloc, primarily a history of capitalism in Europe, and a repudiation of the convergence of big business with the state. Belloc lays out two alternatives: distributism and collectivism.

Overview
This book lays out, in very broad outline, Belloc's version of European economic history, starting with ancient pagan states, in which slavery was critical to the economy, through the medieval Christendom process which transformed an economy based on serf labour in a state in which the property was well distributed, to 19th and 20th century capitalism. Belloc argues that the development of capitalism was not a natural consequence of the Industrial Revolution, but a consequence of the earlier dissolution of the monasteries in England, which then shaped the course of English industrialisation. English capitalism then spread across the world.

Belloc then makes his case for the natural instability of pure capitalism and discusses how he believes that attempts to reform capitalism will lead almost inexorably to an economy in which state regulation has removed the freedom of capitalism and thereby replaced capitalism with the Servile State, which shares with ancient slavery the fact that positive law (as opposed to custom or economic necessity by themselves) dictates that certain people will work for others, who likewise must take care of them.

In the ninth section of the book, titled "The Servile State Has Begun," Belloc explores various ways the servile state has started to creep its way back into modern life. Among these he includes minimum wage laws, employers liability laws, the Insurance Act, and compulsory arbitration.

Belloc used his Catholicism and his experience of living alongside the small-scale peasant farmers of the Sussex Weald to advocate his thesis of having a property-owning democracy based on peasant smallholdings that would bring together the different social classes.

Reception
A 1912 review in The Guardian suggested Belloc's embrace of widespread property ownership seemed "impracticable for a proletarian population with no appreciable margin for saving and with no adequate spirit of cooperation."

In a 1946 article for Polemic, George Orwell described the work as written in a "tiresome style" and argued that the remedy it suggested was "impossible". However, he considered that it foretold the sorts of things that were happening in the 1930s with "remarkable insight".

Kenneth Minogue's 2010 book The Servile Mind was inspired by Belloc's book. Minogue described Belloc's book as somewhat dated but still offering valuable insights into the development of servility and dependence on government largesse, which Minogue tended to regard unfavorably. Austrian School economist Friedrich von Hayek praised the truth of Belloc's predictions in his book The Road to Serfdom and subtitled his chapter, "Economic Control and Totalitarianism", with the quote from The Servile State, "the control of the production of wealth is the control of human life itself."

References

External links
 

Books about economic policy
1912 non-fiction books
Books by Hilaire Belloc
1912 in economics
Distributism